A yuzu bath, also known as a yuzuyu (柚子湯), is a bathing tradition that is celebrated on the winter solstice in Japan. Yuzu fruits, citrus fruit of East Asian origin known for their characteristically strong aroma and the fragrant oil from their skin (nomilin), are floated in the hot water of the bath, releasing their aroma. The fruit may also be floated cut in half, allowing the citrus juice to mingle with the bathwater and color it yellow-orange, or enclosed in a cloth bag. Alternatively, yuzu-scented bath salts are used. Yuzu baths are believed to guard against colds, treat the roughness of skin, warm the body, and relax the mind.

Hot spring bathing is widely used for the regulation of human physical conditions. Hot spring bath is pleasant to take and bathing has very few adverse effects during a long-term treatment. In humans, hot springs have been reported to improve skin conditions, and it is also known that hot spring therapy has especially beneficial effects on dermatology such as atopic dermatitis, ichthyosis and psoriasis. In traditional Japanese hot spring villages, there are many traditions that various wild animals found highly efficacious hot springs in wound healing. These therapeutic effects of hot spring bathing on the skin have not been fully elucidated in human medicine. The reason is that there are few laboratory animals that are readily available to evaluate dermatologically the effects of hot spring bathing. Yuzu baths, have traditionally been used to promote psychosomatic health in Japan. While the yuzu bath produces a distinctive, pleasing aroma of citrus and floral, the efficacy of its fragrance remains unknown. The soothing effects of the fragrance of yuzu essential oil from yuzu bath from the perspective of autonomic nervous system activity, which plays a crucial role in the integrity of the mind-body connection.

History 
The custom of sitting in yuzu baths on the winter solstice originates from the Japanese tradition of adding seasonal plants to bath water for medicinal or therapeutic purposes as well as general enjoyment. Yuzu baths, originating to the Edo period (1603–1867), may have been inspired by the goroawase (語呂合わせ,  "phonetic matching") of the characters for the words “winter solstice” (冬至) and “hot-spring cure” (湯治), both of which can be read as tōji.

Hot spring water supplied by Yuda hot spring distribution cooperative used in this study. Yuda hot spring is located in Yamaguchi City, Yamaguchi Prefecture, Japan. Yuda hot spring is categorized into non-volcanic hot springs which are not derived from volcanic activity. The temperature of the welling-up hot spring is as high as 72 degrees C - 76 degrees C to the extent that the geothermal gradient alone cannot explain. Components of hot spring were analyzed by Yamaguchi Prefectural Institute of Public Health and Environment (Yamaguchi, Japan).

Past Case
Case Infants and children who have severe egg allergies and/or eczema have a higher risk of tree nut allergies. A 7 year old boy was presented to an emergency room complaining of generalized wheals and dyspnea after 5 - 10 minutes of bathing with Japanese Yuzu. Pediatricians diagnosed anaphylaxis and administered an intramuscular injection of epinephrine. Then, he was referred to a dermatology clinic to determine the culprit allergens. He had a complication of atopic dermatitis and a history of anaphylaxis caused by cashew nuts. His symptom of atopic dermatitis was moderate disease according to investigator's global assessment. His parents had eaten cashew nuts at home and also made homemade seasonings with yuzu. He also experienced itchy oral discomfort when he drank a pectin-containing fermented milk product. From cross-sensitization among cashew nut, pectin, and citrus fruits had been reported. Has been suspected that the transdermal allergic reaction to yuzu bath additives. Researchers performed a skin prick test that revealed strong reactions to cashew nuts, pistachios, yuzu endocarp, ingredients that belonged in the bath additives, pectin from citrus, and a pectin-containing fermented milk product.

Capybara baths

In 1982 at the Izu Shaboten Zoo in Itō, Shizuoka, Japan, an employee cleaning the capybara enclosure with hot water noticed the animals huddling together in a warm puddle. Capybaras develop rough dry skin in the winter. Capybaras originally live in the climate of high-temperature and high-humidity, and they spend a lot of time underwater. Capybaras prefer to soak in a hot spring in the cold winter. Hot spring bathing has a beneficial effect on their skin in winter. Continuing on since the year it started, employees will prepare a yuzu bath for the capybaras during the winter. The Izu Shaboten Zoo is the first zoo to have this, and other zoos now also feature it. Since 2020, videos of the capybara baths have been heavily shared across the internet on social media websites such as Twitter and YouTube and have gained millions of views.

References

Japanese traditions
Winter traditions